Andrei Gabriel Torje (born 22 November 1989) is a Romanian professional footballer who plays for TFF First League club Gençlerbirliği. He is a versatile right winger with the ability to swap onto the left side of the field during games.

Torje was named Romanian Footballer of the Year in 2011.

Club career

Politehnica Timișoara
Torje made his debut during the 2005–06 season for Politehnica Timișoara against Argeș Pitești and scored on his second match, against Farul Constanța. He was promoted in the first squad by Gheorghe Hagi, manager of Timișoara at that time.

Dinamo Bucharest
On 15 January 2008, Torje signed a five-year contract with Dinamo București. The reported transfer fee was $2.5 million. He played his 100th match in Liga I for Dinamo on 6 May 2011, in a defeat against CFR Cluj.

Udinese
On 30 August 2011, he signed a five-year contract with Serie A club Udinese for an undisclosed fee, rumored to be around €7 million. He played his first game in Serie A against U.S. Lecce, on 11 September 2011, even though he had only five days of training with his new team, and he had an impressive performance, suggesting that Alexis Sánchez may not be as irreplaceable as first thought.

On 5 February 2012, Torje scored his first goal in the Serie A in a 3–2 loss against Fiorentina. On 24 March, in a game against Palermo he equalized the score in the 85th minute, giving his team a 1–1 draw.

Loan to Granada
In order to get more playing time, on 8 June 2012, Torje signed for La Liga side Granada on a season long loan. He made his debut for the Spanish team on 20 August, in a 1–0 away defeat against Rayo Vallecano. Halfway through the season Torje was considered one of the most successful transfers in the 2012–13 La Liga, and he became a crucial part of the team. He was praised for his performance in the 1–0 victory over La Liga champions, Real Madrid, on 2 February 2013.

Loan to Espanyol
On 2 September 2013, Torje began his second journey in La Liga this time being loaned at the second major club in Barcelona, RCD Espanyol. He made his debut for the club on 23 September in a 3–2 win over Athletic Bilbao. He played only 12 games for Espanyol, six in the starting lineup and six as a substitute, without scoring a goal. Thus, the Spanish side didn't activate the option to buy the player at the end of the loaning period.

Loan to Konyaspor
In June 2014, Turkish Super Lig side Konyaspor announced that they reached an agreement with Udinese to loan the player for a season.

Loan to Dinamo București
On 2 February 2018, he rejoined Dinamo București on loan until the end of the 2017–18 season.

Sivasspor
On 1 September 2018, he returned to Turkey, signing with Sivasspor.

AEL
On 4 February 2020, he signed a contract with Superleague club AEL. On 22 June 2020, he scored a brace, helping to a 3–1 home win against Volos for the second game of the 2019–20 Superleague playoffs.

Bandırmaspor
After leaving AEL at the end of 2020, Torje moved to Turkish TFF First League club Bandırmaspor in January 2021.

Farul Constanța
On 3 June 2022, joined Farul Constanța on a two-year deal. On 29 December 2022, Torje was released from the club after having his contract mutually terminated.

Gençlerbirliği
On 6 January 2023, Torje joined Turkish TFF First League club Gençlerbirliği.

International career
Torje was the captain of the Romania under-21 football team side. He also made his debut for the senior side in a friendly match against Albania on 3 September 2010.

He scored his first international goal in a match against Cyprus. On 2 September 2011, he scored twice in a 2–0 win over Luxembourg. Torje scored his first competitive goals in a 2–0 win over Luxembourg during the UEFA Euro 2012 qualifying. He scored three goals during the 2014 World Cup qualifiers as Romania reached the play-offs only to lose to Greece. He did not score in Romania's successful qualification for UEFA Euro 2016 but was chosen in the tournament's 23-man squad. He started in Romania's 1–1 draw to Switzerland and made brief appearances as a substitute in Romania's defeats to France and Albania with the latter one confirming their elimination from the tournament.

Career statistics

Club

International stats

International goals

* Unofficial match according to the Laws of the Game (excessive number of Romanian substitutions)

Honours

Club
Politehnica Timișoara
Cupa României runner-up: 2006–07

Dinamo București
Cupa României runner-up: 2010–11

Individual
Gazeta Sporturilor Romanian Footballer of the Year: 2011

References

External links

 
 
 
 

1989 births
Living people
Sportspeople from Timișoara
Romanian footballers
Romania under-21 international footballers
Romania international footballers
Association football midfielders
FC CFR Timișoara players
FC Politehnica Timișoara players
FC Dinamo București players
Udinese Calcio players
Granada CF footballers
RCD Espanyol footballers
Konyaspor footballers
FC Akhmat Grozny players
Kardemir Karabükspor footballers
Sivasspor footballers
Athlitiki Enosi Larissa F.C. players
Bandırmaspor footballers
FCV Farul Constanța players
Gençlerbirliği S.K. footballers
Liga I players
Liga II players
Serie A players
La Liga players
Süper Lig players
TFF First League players
Russian Premier League players
Super League Greece players
Romanian expatriate footballers
Expatriate footballers in Italy
Expatriate footballers in Spain
Expatriate footballers in Turkey
Expatriate footballers in Russia
Expatriate footballers in Greece
Romanian expatriate sportspeople in Italy
Romanian expatriate sportspeople in Spain
Romanian expatriate sportspeople in Russia
Romanian expatriate sportspeople in Turkey
Romanian expatriate sportspeople in Greece
UEFA Euro 2016 players